Bachelor's Cove was a hamlet on Valen Island in Newfoundland.

See also 
List of ghost towns in Newfoundland and Labrador

Ghost towns in Newfoundland and Labrador

References